La Gloria Independent School District No. 906 (LGISD) is a public school district based in the community of La Gloria, Texas (USA).

The district has one school - La Gloria Elementary - that serves students in grades pre-kindergarten through six.

Seventh through twelfth graders attend Premont High School of Premont ISD or Falfurrias High School of Brooks County ISD (Falfurrias).

In 2009, the school district was rated "academically acceptable" by the Texas Education Agency.

History
It was established on October 9, 1909 as La Gloria School District No. 28, and was initially in Nueces County. Initially the district rented a facility owned by a private individual. In 1910 a brick school building was built on Block 5 in La Gloria, a community in Jim Wells County. The school district's name, the following year, changed to La Gloria Common School District No. 21 with the district now being of Jim Wells County. A replacement facility opened in the 1930s. A cafeteria facility opened in 1950. An auditorium and a classroom wing opened in 1956. The district's name changed to the current one effective September 1, 1978. In 1997 and 2002 a library and gymnasium/multipurpose facility were built, respectively. In 1999 the library's addition, a classroom called Room 12, was installed.

References

External links

School districts in Jim Wells County, Texas
School districts in Nueces County, Texas
1909 establishments in Texas
School districts established in 1909